Radoslav "Rasho" Nesterović (born May 30, 1976) is a Slovenian former professional basketball player. He holds citizenship in both Slovenia and Greece. During his career in the NBA, Nesterović played for the Minnesota Timberwolves, San Antonio Spurs, Indiana Pacers, and Toronto Raptors. He retired in 2011.

Playing career

Early life and career in Europe
Nesterović was born in Ljubljana, SR Slovenia, SFR Yugoslavia to father Čedo, a Bosnian Serb employee of the Slovenian Railways, and a mother Branka, a midwife in the Ljubljana University Medical Centre. He started playing basketball with the KD Slovan youth team. Later, he played with the junior club of KK Partizan and made his debut during the 1992–93 season.

PAOK
During the Yugoslav wars, Nesterović moved to PAOK of the Greek League. While playing there, he obtained a second citizenship (Greek) to avoid EU restrictions. To obtain Greek citizenship he had to administratively change his name in the eyes of Greek law. While in Greece and other EU countries, he thus competed as a domestic player under the name Radoslav "Rasho" Makris.

Olimpija Ljubljana
Ahead of the 1995–96 season, Nesterović returned to his hometown to play for Union Olimpija. Competing in the Slovenian domestic league, his averages were 30 minutes, 17 points and 14 rebounds per game. The summer of 1996 off season brought another significant feat for Nesterović; while playing for Slovenia's youth national team he was named the MVP at the 1996 FIBA Europe Under-20 Championship. The next season, 1996–97, he was part of that legendary Olimpija team that reached the 1997 EuroLeague Final Four in Rome. In that season, he played an average of 17.0 minutes per game, averaging 8.0 points, and 4.3 rebounds per game in the EuroLeague.

Virtus Bologna
The exposure on the biggest European stage led to a big time move for Nesterović to the Italian League power Virtus (Kinder) Bologna during the summer of 1997. In the first season with his new club, he scored an average of 8 points and grabbed an average of 6 rebounds per game, in the Italian domestic league. In the EuroLeague, he scored 6.5 points and grabbed 6.0 rebounds per game. He helped Virtus win the EuroLeague title, playing alongside legendary players such as Sasha Danilović, Zoran Savić, and Antoine Rigaudeau. In the EuroLeague Final, Nesterović scored 6 points and grabbed 9 rebounds.

NBA debut: Minnesota Timberwolves
Nesterović was a first-round draft pick (17th overall) of the Minnesota Timberwolves in the 1998 NBA Draft. He joined the Timberwolves just before the end of the 1998–99 season and played there through the 2002–03 season.

Nesterović stayed in Minnesota for four full seasons because he played only the last two regular-season games, plus all of his team's games in the playoffs, in his first season. His best season with the Timberwolves was 2002–03, when he averaged 11.2 points and 6.6 rebounds per game, earning himself a 6-year contract with the San Antonio Spurs in 2004. Although the Timberwolves were offering him a contract worth $12 million more, Nesterović opted for the move to Texas for a shot at the NBA title.

San Antonio Spurs
In his first season with San Antonio, Nesterović scored 8.7 points per game and grabbed 7.7 rebounds per game. In his second season with the Spurs, 2004–05, he suffered an ankle injury, and was limited to 70 games. Nevertheless, he remained the starting center for the majority of the season, and, along with his colleague from the Slovenian national basketball team, Beno Udrih, he ultimately won an NBA title with the Spurs that year.

Toronto Raptors
On June 21, 2006, Nesterović was traded to the Toronto Raptors along with cash in exchange for Matt Bonner, Eric Williams and a second round pick in the 2009 NBA Draft. In his first season with the Raptors, he averaged 6.2 points, 4.5 rebounds, and 1.0 blocks per game.

On April 2, 2008, at 7:34 pm EST, Nesterović hit his first three-point shot ever in the regular season, with a pump fake, for a buzzer beater against the Atlanta Hawks, in Atlanta.

While playing for the Raptors, he was nicknamed Nestea as the fans found it "refreshing to have a true center."

Indiana Pacers
On July 9, 2008, Nesterović was traded along with the Raptors' T.J. Ford, Maceo Baston and the 17th pick in the draft (Roy Hibbert) to the Indiana Pacers, in exchange for Jermaine O'Neal and the 41st pick in the draft (Nathan Jawai).

Return to the Toronto Raptors
On July 30, 2009, Nesterović officially was signed by the Raptors, reportedly with the biannual exception of $1.9 million for one season.

Return to Europe: Olympiacos

For the 2010–11 season Nesterović returned to Europe, when he signed a two-year contract with the Greek League powerhouse Olympiacos. He was released by Olympiacos in July 2011.

National team career
Nesterović was the captain of the senior men's Slovenian national basketball team until his retirement from the national team in 2008. He helped his national team finish in 6th place at the EuroBasket 2005 in Belgrade, and to thus secure a place at the 2006 FIBA World Championship. At the EuroBasket 2005, he played an average of 21.7 minutes, scored an average of 6 points, and grabbed an average of 6.2 rebounds per game.

Post-playing career
Since 2014, Nesterović holds a position as a Secretary-General of the Basketball Federation of Slovenia. In 2015, he was elected a member of the FIBA commission of players.

Personal life
Nesterović has a sister and five children. He is the godfather to Luka Dončić, the third pick of the 2018 NBA draft. He speaks Serbian, Slovenian, Italian, Greek, and English.

NBA career statistics

Regular season

|-
| align="left" | 
| align="left" | Minnesota
| 2 || 0 || 15.0 || .250 || .000 || 1.000 || 4.0 || .5 || .0 || .0 || 4.0
|-
| align="left" | 
| align="left" | Minnesota
| 82 || 55 || 21.0 || .476 || .000 || .573 || 4.6 || 1.1 || .3 || 1.0 || 5.7
|-
| align="left" | 
| align="left" | Minnesota
| 73 || 39 || 16.9 || .461 || .000 || .523 || 3.9 || .6 || .3 || .9 || 4.5
|-
| align="left" | 
| align="left" | Minnesota
| 82 || 82 || 27.0 || .493 || .000 || .549 || 6.5 || .9 || .5 || 1.3 || 8.4
|-
| align="left" | 
| align="left" | Minnesota
| 77 || 77 || 30.4 || .525 || .000 || .642 || 6.5 || 1.5 || .5 || 1.5 || 11.2
|-
| align="left" | 
| align="left" | San Antonio
| 82 || 82 || 28.7 || .469 || .000 || .474 || 7.7 || 1.4 || .6 || 2.0 || 8.7
|-
| style="text-align:left;background:#afe6ba;" |†
| align="left" | San Antonio
| 70 || 70 || 25.5 || .460 || .000 || .467 || 6.6 || 1.0 || .4 || 1.7 || 5.9
|-
| align="left" | 
| align="left" | San Antonio
| 80 || 51 || 18.9 || .515 || .000 || .600 || 3.9 || .4 || .3 || 1.1 || 4.5
|-
| align="left" | 
| align="left" | Toronto
| 80 || 73 || 21.0 || .546 || .000 || .680 || 4.5 || .9 || .5 || 1.1 || 6.2
|-
| align="left" | 
| align="left" | Toronto
| 71 || 39 || 20.9 || .550 || .333 || .755 || 4.8 || 1.2 || .3 || .7 || 7.8
|-
| align="left" | 
| align="left" | Indiana
| 70 || 19 || 17.3 || .513 || .000 || .781 || 3.4 || 1.6 || .4 || .5 || 6.8
|-
| align="left" | 
| align="left" | Toronto
| 42 || 8 || 9.8 || .544 || .000 || .200 || 2.1 || .6 || .2 || .4 || 3.9
|- class="sortbottom"
| style="text-align:center;" colspan="2"| Career
| 811 || 595 || 22.2 || .502 || .077 || .585 || 5.1 || 1.0 || .4 || 1.2 || 6.8

Playoffs

|-
| align="left" | 1999
| align="left" | Minnesota
| 3 || 0 || 9.7 || .500 || .000 || .000 || 2.3 || 1.0 || .0 || .0 || 2.7
|-
| align="left" | 2000
| align="left" | Minnesota
| 4 || 4 || 31.5 || .440 || .000 || .500 || 3.3 || 1.5 || .8 || 1.8 || 6.3
|-
| align="left" | 2001
| align="left" | Minnesota
| 4 || 2 || 12.3 || .385 || .000 || .000 || 3.0 || .8 || .3 || .8 || 2.5
|-
| align="left" | 2002
| align="left" | Minnesota
| 3 || 3 || 30.7 || .484 || .000 || .444 || 6.7 || 1.0 || .3 || .0 || 11.3
|-
| align="left" | 2003
| align="left" | Minnesota
| 6 || 6 || 28.2 || .500 || .000 || .667 || 5.0 || .7 || .2 || .7 || 7.0
|-
| align="left" | 2004
| align="left" | San Antonio
| 10 || 10 || 26.1 || .433 || .000 || .167 || 5.5 || 1.0 || .3 || 1.1 || 5.9
|-
| style="text-align:left;background:#afe6ba;" | 2005†
| align="left" | San Antonio
| 15 || 0 || 7.6 || .417 || .000 || .000 || 1.7 || .1 || .1 || .3 || .7
|-
| align="left" | 2006
| align="left" | San Antonio
| 9 || 1 || 12.7 || .579 || 1.000 || 1.000 || 3.3 || .1 || .2 || .6 || 2.8
|-
| align="left" | 2007
| align="left" | Toronto
| 5 || 4 || 14.2 || .467 || .000 || 1.000 || 4.6 || .6 || .0 || .4 || 3.4
|-
| align="left" | 2008
| align="left" | Toronto
| 5 || 2 || 15.4 || .500 || .000 || .500 || 2.6 || .6 || .2 || .4 || 4.6
|- class="sortbottom"
| style="text-align:center;" colspan="2"| Career
| 64 || 32 || 17.2 || .468 || .500 || .500 || 3.6 || .6 || .2 || .6 || 4.0

References

External links

NBA.com Profile

FIBA Europe Profile
Euroleague.net Profile
Italian League Profile 

1976 births
Living people
2006 FIBA World Championship players
Centers (basketball)
Eastern Orthodox Christians from Slovenia
Greek Basket League players
Greek expatriate basketball people in Serbia
Greek expatriate basketball people in the United States
Greek expatriate basketball people in Italy
Greek men's basketball players
Greek people of Serbian descent
Greek people of Slovenian descent
Indiana Pacers players
KK Partizan players
KK Olimpija players
Lega Basket Serie A players
Minnesota Timberwolves draft picks
Minnesota Timberwolves players
National Basketball Association players from Slovenia
Olympiacos B.C. players
P.A.O.K. BC players
San Antonio Spurs players
Slovenian expatriate basketball people in Canada
Slovenian expatriate basketball people in Italy
Slovenian expatriate basketball people in Serbia
Slovenian expatriate basketball people in the United States
Slovenian men's basketball players
Slovenian people of Serbian descent
Basketball players from Ljubljana
Toronto Raptors players
Virtus Bologna players